Irvinebank is a rural town and locality in the Shire of Mareeba, Queensland, Australia.

Geography
The Great Dividing Range forms the south-eastern and southern boundary of the locality.

From further west it can be accessed from the Burke Developmental Road at Petford.

The terrain is generally mountainous with the following named peaks:

 Billing Knob 
 Boot Hill 
 Elizabeth Bluffs
 Geebung Hill 
 Giblets Peak 
 Hermit Hill 
 Iron Mountain 
 Lead Hill 
 Mount Babinda 
 Mount Gossan 
 Mount Luxton
 Mount Misery

History

First known as Gibbs Camp, the town was founded in 1884 by John Moffat, who had purchased the mining leases from the original prospectors. From 1889 he owned the Vulcan tin mine. He built a dam, a mill, smelters and other infrastructure that attracted settlers and miners to the area. Moffat was born at Newmilns, Ayrshire, Scotland, which is situated on the River Irvine, and it is assumed he named the town Irvinebank in honour of his home town. Irvinebank became a thriving town with an economy based on mining, milling and smelting.

In late 1884, Irvinebank became famous for a massacre of Aboriginal Australians and a subsequent inquiry. In October of that year a Native Police patrol led by officers William Nichols and Roland Garraway conducted a series of raids in the area during which an Aboriginal camp was fired upon. An old man, two women and a 6-year-old child were killed. Another two Aboriginal men were arrested, never to be seen again. John Moffat alerted authorities and an investigation was held. Seven troopers were later charged with murder and Sub-inspector Nichols was charged with being an accessory. At a trial in Townsville the magistrate concluded there was no case against Nichols and he was discharged "amid considerable applause". The troopers were remanded in custody and in October 1885 they too were discharged. Nichols, however, was dismissed from the Native Police by the Queensland government and the Irvinebank massacre is regarded as a turning point away from the policy of indiscriminate killing of Indigenous people in the colony.

Irvinebank Post Office opened on 1 June 1885 (a receiving office had been open from 1884).

Irvinebank Provisional School opened on 27 September 1886. On 1 August 1890 it became Irvinebank State School.

Montalbion State School opened circa 1888 and closed in 1906.

Stannary Hills Provisional School opened on 18 January 1904. In 1907, it became Stannary Hills State School. It closed circa 1931.

Rocky Bluffs Provisional School opened on 1904 and closed on 1910.

Gurrumba Provisional School opened in 1907. On 1 January 1909, it became Gurrumba Provisional School. It closed circa 1916.

Hale's Siding Provisional School opened on 22 February 1915 and closed in February 1922.

In the ten years up to the 1911 census the population had swelled from 619 to 1264, but another 10 years saw it reduced back to only 607 and continued to fall.

At the 2006 census, Irvinebank had a population of 311.

Although currently and historically within the Shire of Mareeba, between 2008 and 2013, the Shire of Mareeba (and hence Invinebank) was within the Tablelands Region) until 2014 when the shire was re-instated following a vote by the residents.

Heritage listings 

Irvinebank has a number of heritage-listed sites, including:
 High Street: Irvinebank State School
 Jessie Street: Queensland National Bank
 off Jessie Street: Irvinebank State Treatment Works
 16 O'Callaghan Street: Loudoun House
 Mareeba Mining District: Vulcan Mine
 McDonald Street: Irvinebank School of Arts Hall
 Stannary Hills-Irvinebank Road: Stannary Hills Tramways

Education 
Irvinebank State School is a government primary (Prep-6) school for boys and girls at High Street. In 2018, the school had an enrolment of 9 students with 2 teachers (1 full-time equivalent) and 4 non-teaching staff (1 full-time equivalent).

There is no secondary school in Irvinebank. The nearest government secondary schools are Dimbulah State School (to Year 10) in neighbouring Dimbulah to the north-west and Herberton State School (to Year 10) in Herberton to the east. Catholic secondary education to Year 12 is available in Herberton, while the nearest government secondary school offering schooling to Year 12 is Atherton State High School in Atherton to the north-east;  Given the size of the locality, some children might live too far away to attend any of these schools; distance education and boarding schools would be other options.

Facilities 
Irvinebank Post Office is at 16 O'Callaghan Street.

Irvinebank Rural Fire Station is on Jessie Street in the town.

Irvinebank Cemetery is on Cemetery Road off the Herberton Petford Road just to the south-west of the town.

Montalbion Pioneer Cemetery is in the former town of Montalbion along a signed dirt track off the Herberton Petford Road. It is no longer open for burials.

Amenities 
Irvinebank School of Arts is a public hall at 2633 Herberton Petford Road. There are a number of monuments and memorials there, including:

 a cairn with memorial to John Moffat and his secretary and town historian Allan Ferguson Waddell, erected by the Royal Geographical Society of Queensland
Irvinebank Roll of Honour, commemorating those from the town who served in World War I

Irvinebank Tavern is at 2656 Herberton Petford Road. It provides meals, cabin accommodation and petrol.

Attractions 
Loudoun House Museum is at 16 O'Callaghan Street in heritage-listed Loudon House. The museum presents the local history of the area and has resources for family history.

Notable residents 
 Henry Dalziel, recipient of the Victoria Cross in World War I was born in Irvinebank

See also
 List of tramways in Queensland

References 

On the Irvinebank Massacre 1884:
Dillon Paul, The Irvinebank Massacre, ISBN 9781922449498, Connor Court Publishing, Brisbane, 2021.

External links

 

 
Populated places in Far North Queensland
Towns in Queensland
Shire of Mareeba
Localities in Queensland